As of March 2020, Air Dolomiti operates routes from Frankfurt Airport and Munich Airport to the following 24 destinations in Italy, Austria and Sweden in cooperation with parent Lufthansa.

The list includes the city, country, the codes of the International Air Transport Association (IATA airport code) and the International Civil Aviation Organization (ICAO airport code), and the airport's name, with the airline's hubs marked. The list also contains the beginning and end year of services, with destinations marked if the services was not continual and if they are seasonal, and for dates which occur in the future.

Destinations

References

Lists of airline destinations